Ivan Masařík (born 14 September 1967) is a Czech biathlete. He competed at the 1992, 1994, 1998 and the 2002 Winter Olympics.

References

External links
 

1967 births
Living people
Czech male biathletes
Olympic biathletes of Czechoslovakia
Olympic biathletes of the Czech Republic
Biathletes at the 1992 Winter Olympics
Biathletes at the 1994 Winter Olympics
Biathletes at the 1998 Winter Olympics
Biathletes at the 2002 Winter Olympics
People from Jilemnice
Sportspeople from the Liberec Region